Louvigny or Louvigné is the name or part of the name of several communes in France:

Louvigny, Calvados, in the Calvados département
Louvigny, Moselle, in the Moselle département 
Louvigny, Pyrénées-Atlantiques, in the Pyrénées-Atlantiques département 
Louvigny, Sarthe, in the Sarthe département 
Louvigné, in the Mayenne département 
Louvigné-de-Bais, in the Ille-et-Vilaine département 
Louvigné-du-Désert, in the Ille-et-Vilaine département 
Louvignies-Quesnoy, in the Nord département